Courts of Virginia include:

;State courts of Virginia
Supreme Court of Virginia
Court of Appeals of Virginia
Virginia Circuit Court (120 courts divided among 31 judicial circuits)
Virginia General District Court (courts in 32 districts)
Virginia Juvenile and Domestic Relations District Court (courts in 32 districts)

Federal courts located in Virginia
United States Court of Appeals for the Fourth Circuit (headquartered in Richmond, having jurisdiction over the United States District Courts of Maryland, North Carolina, South Carolina, Virginia, and West Virginia)
United States District Court for the Eastern District of Virginia
United States District Court for the Western District of Virginia

Former federal courts of Virginia
United States District Court for the District of Virginia (extinct, subdivided)
United States District Court for the District of Potomac (1801-1802; also contained the District of Columbia and pieces of Maryland; extinct, reorganized)

See also
 Judiciary of Virginia

References

External links
National Center for State Courts - directory of state court websites.

Courts in the United States